Jhansi district is one of the districts of Uttar Pradesh state in northern India. The city of Jhansi is the district headquarters. The district is bordered on the north by Jalaun District, to the east by Hamirpur and Mahoba districts, to the south by Tikamgarh District of Madhya Pradesh state, to the southwest by Lalitpur District, which is joined to Jhansi District by a narrow corridor, and on the east by the Datia and Bhind districts of Madhya Pradesh. Population 19,98,603 (2011 census). Lalitpur District, which extends into the hill country to the south, was added to Jhansi District in 1891, and made a separate district again in 1974.

History
In 1861 the city of Jhansi and a dependent territory was ceded to Gwalior State and the capital of the district was moved to Jhansi-Nawabad (Jhansi Refounded), a village without "cantonment" (military camp). Jhansi (the old city) became the capital of a "subah" (provínce) within the state of Gwalior, but in 1886 was returned to British rule as a district of the United Provinces of Agra and Oudh in exchange for the Gwalior Fort and the cantonment of Morar nearby. (It had been given to the Maharaja of Gwalior, but came under British rule in 1886 as the result of a territorial swap.) The population of Jhansi in 1901 was about 55,000 while Jhansi district's population had been about 407,000 in 1891.

Under the Mughal Empire at the time of Akbar, the area of today's Jhansi district was part of the sarkar of Erachh in Agra Subah. The area was part of the mahals of Erachh, Bhander, Bijpur, Jhansi, "Pandor" (i.e. Pandwaha), and Jhatra. Jhatra consisted of 4 mahals grouped together.

Geography
Several railway lines serve the district. South of Jhansi District lies the hill country of Bundelkhand, which slopes down from the Vindhya Range. The district consists of the level plain of Bundelkhand, distinguished for its deep black soil, known as mar, and admirably adapted for the cultivation of cotton. The district is intersected or bounded by three principal rivers, the Pahuj, Betwa and Dhasan.

The main city in Jhansi district is Jhansi. Other towns are Mauranipur, Garautha, Moth, Babina, Chirgaon, Samthar Gursarai Erich, etc.

Demographics

According to the 2011 census Jhansi district has a population of 1,998,603, roughly equal to the nation of Slovenia or the US state of New Mexico. This gives it a ranking of 231st in India (out of a total of 640). Its population growth rate over the decade 2001-2011 was 14.54%. Jhansi has a sex ratio of 890 females for every 1000 males, and a literacy rate of 69.68%. Scheduled Castes made up 28.14% of the population.

At the time of the 2011 Census of India, 95.35% of the population in the district spoke Hindi and 3.36% Bundeli as their first language.

District at a Glance

Tehsil
There are 5 tehsil in district Jhansi:
 Jhansi
 Mauranipur
 Garautha
 Tehroli
 Moth

Development Blocks
There are 8 Development Blocks:
 Babina
 Badagaon
 Bamaur
 Bangra
 Chirgaon
 Gursarai
 Mauranipur
 Moth

Constituencies
There are 4 constituencies in Jhansi District:
 222 – Babina
 223 – Jhansi Nagar
 224 – Mauranipur
 225 – Garautha

Villages
 

Palra
Gonti

References

External links

 

 
Districts of Uttar Pradesh